Sjusjøen is a cross country skiing destination in the municipality of Ringsaker in Innlandet county, Norway. Situated on the mountain plateau south of Sjusjøen is Hedmarksvidda.

The area is the site of many holiday cottages plus a hotel and a youth hostel for accommodation. Sjusjøen and neighboring village of Nordseter (to the west) were both originally mountain farm communities, which - with their easily accessible forest and mountain terrain - have developed into skiing destinations. 

The tracks run all the way to Lillehammer and Øyer municipalities and they also connect with the Olympic tracks at the Birkebeineren Ski Stadium. The trails go through forested and mountain terrain, and are clearly marked with signposts.

Sjusjøen is also the name of a lake, centrally located in the area. The area also comprises the largest concentration of recreational homes in Norway.

References

External links
 Sjusjøen website
 

Sport in Innlandet
Ski areas and resorts in Norway
Ringsaker